"Super Generation" is the 13th single by the Japanese voice actress and singer Nana Mizuki, released on 18 January 2006. The single reached number 6 on the Japanese Oricon charts. "Super Generation" is Mizuki's first self-composed song.

Track listing
Super Generation
Lyrics, composition: Nana Mizuki
Arrangement: Junpei Fujita (Elements Garden)
Ending theme for TV Asahi program 
Brave Phoenix
Lyrics, composition, arrangement: Noriyasu Agematsu (Elements Garden)
Insert song for anime television series Magical Girl Lyrical Nanoha A's

Lyrics, composition: Yamato Ito
Arrangement: Nittoku Inoue
Opening theme for PS2 game

Charts

Reference 
Nana Mizuki songs
2006 singles
Songs written by Nana Mizuki
2006 songs
King Records (Japan) singles